Lai Wei (born 2 January 1997) is a Chinese footballer currently playing as a full-back for Nantong Zhiyun.

Club career
Wei Lai would play for the Shanghai Port youth team before being promoted to their senior team in the 2018 league season and then loaned out to neighbouring second tier club Shanghai Shenxin on 14 September 2018. His loan period would see him go on to make his senior debut in a league game against Shenzhen in a 3-1 defeat. This was followed by his first goal, which was in a league game against Zhejiang Greentown on 10 August 2018 that ended in a 3-1 defeat. 

The following campaigns he was loaned out to second tier clubs Nantong Zhiyun and Kunshan before he permanently transferred to Nantong on 18 April 2022. He would go on to establish himself within the team and helped the club gain promotion to the top tier at the end of the 2022 China League One season.

Career statistics
.

References

External links

1997 births
Living people
Chinese footballers
China youth international footballers
Association football defenders
China League One players
Shanghai Port F.C. players
Shanghai Shenxin F.C. players
Nantong Zhiyun F.C. players